BPS Direct, L.L.C, doing business as Bass Pro Shops,  is an American privately held retailer which specializes in hunting, fishing, camping, and other related outdoor recreation merchandise. With headquarters in Springfield, Missouri, Bass Pro Shops has a workforce of about 40,000. Bass Pro also owns Cabela's, another retailer that specializes in similar categories.

History

Bass Pro Shops started in 1972 when Johnny Morris started selling fishing tackle out of his dad's Brown Derby Liquor Store in Springfield, Missouri. His father, John A. Morris, was a World War II veteran and often took the family hunting and fishing. Johnny Morris has said his parents, Genny Morris and John A. Morris, taught him to love fishing, hunting, and the outdoors. The first Bass Pro Shops catalog was created in 1974. In 1978, Morris introduced Tracker Boats, the first boat, motor, and trailer package designed for anglers.

In 1981, Morris opened the first Bass Pro Shops outdoor store in Springfield. 1987 is when Morris bought a large, empty plot of land, and 1 year later, he opened Big Cedar Lodge on Table Rock Lake in Missouri's Ozark Mountains.

In 2017, Morris opened the Wonders of Wildlife Museum & Aquarium in Springfield's Bass Pro Shops, which is considered the largest wildlife attraction in the world. In the same year, Bass Pro Shops struck a deal to acquire Cabela's for about $4.5 billion.

Discrimination lawsuit 
In 2011, Bass Pro Shops was sued by The U.S. Equal Employment Opportunity Commission for failure to hire Hispanic and black applicants. In court filings, Bass Pro Shops denied all of the allegations and in 2014, Bass Pro Shops appealed the lower court's ruling, but was rejected by the court. In 2016 Bass Pro Shops tried again and The U.S. Equal Employment Opportunity Commission asked the 5th Circuit Court to reject Bass Pro Shops' appeal because Bass Pro Shops engaged in the practice of "reckless indifference" when it came to hiring minorities. In 2017, Bass Pro Shops settled its discrimination lawsuit with the U.S. Equal Employment Opportunity Commission for $10.5 million. The court noted that any payments Bass Pro Shops made as part of the settlement "should not be construed as an admission of liability." The case was settled by a consent decree, and the court issued no findings on the veracity of the claims of the EEOC. As part of the settlement, Bass Pro Shops agreed to strengthen its diversity hiring and recruiting practices by posting job openings at schools with a significant minority population, participating in job fairs held in communities with large minority populations, posting job openings in publications that have been historically popular with Black and Hispanic audiences, and develop a diversity and inclusion section of its website that lists job opportunities and discusses inclusion efforts.

Deceptive Marketing Lawsuit

In 2022, Bass Pro was sued for Misrepresentation to honor a lifetime warranty. The suit claims that Bass Pro led the consumer to purchase socks on Bass Pro Shops Marketing which stated, "The last sock you’ll ever need to buy."

Acquisitions 
In September 2017, Bass Pro Shops paid $5.5 billion to acquire Cabela's. The deal was financed via preferred equity financing from Goldman Sachs and Pamplona. Goldman Sachs contributed $1.8 billion towards financing and Pamplona contributed the remainder for a total commitment of $2.4 billion.
 
In 2019, Bass Pro Shops sold eleven of Cabela's stores to Sansome Pacific for $324.3 million in a sale-leaseback program. The acquisition of Cabela's resulted in 2,000 jobs lost in Sidney, Nebraska, Cabela's headquarters at the time of the acquisition. Since the acquisition, three stores have closed and eight new stores have opened. As part of Cabela's acquisition, Bass Pro Shops sold Cabela's World's Foremost Bank brand to Synovus and Capital One, a transfer of over $1 billion in assets.

Operating divisions

Retail stores

Bass Pro Shops and Cabela's operates retail locations in the United States, as well as in Canada. The most common stores are known as Outdoor World stores. The largest store currently is the Pyramid in Memphis, Tennessee. As of January 2023, the company operates 177 Bass Pro Shops and Cabela's stores combined.

Boat brands
Bass Pro Shops owns White River Marine Group which manufactures and distributes boats under the brand names Ranger, Nitro, Triton, Tahoe, Tracker, Sun Tracker, Regency, Mako, and Ascend.
 

On May 20, 2021, the White River Marine Group purchased Hatteras Yachts, a company that specializes in creating yachts and speedboats.

Store types 
At every Bass Pro location, there are names on the front of the buildings to represent their theme and location. As of 2022, there are five types of stores: Outdoor World, Outpost, Stick Marsh Outpost, Sportsman's Center, and White River Outpost. All locations contain a 34,000-gallon freshwater aquarium with animal statues, waterfalls, etc.

Outdoor World 
Bass Pro's Outdoor World locations contain theming of being in a cypress forest with animal displays, marble flooring portraying rivers with fish outlines, and more wood to represent the forest theme. Some also contain displays on the ceilings, such as a bear trying to cross a broken bridge with a man on the other side.

Outpost 
Bass Pro's Outpost locations contain themes of a modern wooden Outpost, similar to a cabin near a campsite, with less theming in the aisles, with fish, birds, etc., but has more animal displays on walls with foliage.

Stick Marsh Outpost 
As the name suggests, this location is decorated with the Stick Marsh theme (many islands, swamps, alligators, etc.) as found in Florida, and suggests being in an everglades-type outpost with tin roofing, broken wooden walls, and many leaves hanging from the ceiling with trees in the middle of the aisles. This location can only be found in the Palm Bay Florida's Bass Pro Shop. At its entrance, it contains many animal statues, an old pickup truck on the ceiling, and many photo collections.

Sportsman's Center 
Bass Pro's Sportsman's Center locations contain fewer themes in the store and outside, with a lot more animal displays in the entrance corridor, and more wall-themed displays. Some Sportsman's Centers also contain similar Outdoor World themes.

White River Outpost 
The White River Outpost location in Branson Landing, Missouri is intended to depict the White River's environment with wooden walls and trees, suggesting that you are in Missouri's Ozark Mountains, and many photo collections.

Sponsorship

Affiliation with NASCAR
 
Bass Pro Shops has been a longtime partner of Richard Childress Racing. During the 2022 NASCAR Cup Series season, they are the primary sponsor for the No. 19 car driven by Martin Truex Jr. and Austin Dillon's No. 3 car, as well as hosting the Bass Pro Shops Night Race at Bristol Motor Speedway. In previous seasons, they have also sponsored Dale Earnhardt, Tony Stewart, Jaime McMurray, Ryan Newman, Ty Dillon, and Daniel Hemric. In the Xfinity Series, Bass Pro Shops is the main sponsor for the No. 9 car driven by Noah Gragson.

NRA National Sporting Arms Museum
The NRA National Sporting Arms Museum opened in Springfield's Bass Pro on August 2, 2013. It features sporting artifacts, including some historical firearms from the NRA Museum Collection. The museum also hosts firearms and artwork from the Remington Arms Company factory collection, including engraved Colt revolvers of the American frontier and firearms of U.S. Presidents.

References

External links
 Bass Pro Shops

1972 establishments in Missouri
American companies established in 1972
Companies based in Springfield, Missouri
Firearm commerce
Online retailers of the United States
Privately held companies based in Missouri
Recreational fishing in the United States
Retail companies established in 1972
Sporting goods retailers of the United States
Tony Stewart